A shepherd's gourd (also shepherd's jug} (Spanish: botijo de pastor) is a container for carrying and holding water, which has a gourd-like body, like the ordinary botijo. It has a widened neck that, allows a rope to be tied to hold it to allow it to be carried or tied to another object. Originally it consisted of a small gourd whose interior was emptied and cured, to serve as a vessel for liquids. The shape was later copied by potters in the various shapes of vessels, such as botijillas or canteens. Together with the pilgrim's scallop, it is part of the iconography of the pilgrim in general and of the Way of Saint James.

Background 

Other variants of the name are the "shepherd's jug" or "pumpkin jug" (Spanish:botija de calabaza) and the calabazo or pilgrim's barrel  (Spanish:barril de peregrino). This is how Caro Bellido defnes it in his Spanish lexical dictionary, citing in turn Menéndez Pidal who defined gourd as an old Castilian term used to designate a "vessel in the shape of a gourd."  Jesús Lizcano, in his studies dedicated to the pottery from La Mancha, estimates that when used to carry wine or water, they had a capacity of two liters.

History 

With the name of "Lagenaria siceraria" (a tropical species, relative of the cucurbits) is designated in botany to the pilgrim gourd, considered by the botanist Vernon Hilton Heywood one of the "most primitive plants cultivated by man." Already in 1968, the botanist Herbert George Baker noted that he had found specimens dated between 3500 and 3300 BC in Egyptian tombs, and also in Peruvian burials, around 3000 BC. of C., and in troglodyte cultures of Mexico with an antiquity of 7000 years a. C., Herbert himself left news of the experiments carried out by Whitaker & Carter, showing that the pumpkin could float in seawater for two years without its seeds losing their ability to germinate, thus being able to have crossed the Atlantic Ocean. However, other scholars propose that the journey of pumpkins and their seeds was through the Pacific Ocean, before the discovery of America.

Use of a gourd as a jug or canteen can be traced through different cultures both in Europe and the Americas. Gourd size varies (between 10 and 60 cm), the weight inconsistent, and its shapes varied, made this variety of gourds the chosen vessel for primitive tourists, the pilgrims.

In art 
There is abundant representation of the shepherd's gourd in the iconography of shepherds, pilgrims and farmers (especially the reapers at a rest break). It is also present in sculptures, bas-reliefs and friezes of European art since the 11th century.

See also 
 Botijo

References

Bibliography

External links 

Bottles
Ceramics
Liquid containers